Scholten is a surname of Dutch origin and may refer to:

Arnold Scholten (b. 1962), Dutch professional football player
Carel S. Scholten (1925–2009), Dutch physicist and pioneer of computing, a.o. known for the Dijkstra–Scholten algorithm
Clemens Scholten (born 1955), German theologian
Daniel Scholten (born 1973), Germano-Icelandic novelist and linguist
Dominique Scholten (b. 1988), Dutch professional football player
Frank Scholten (1881–1942), Dutch photographer and author
Frederik von Scholten (1796-1853), Danish naval officer
Frits Scholten (born 1959), Dutch art historian
Gabe Scholten (1921–1997), Dutch sprinter
Gijs Scholten van Aschat (born 1959), Dutch actor
Hendrik Jacobus Scholten (1824–1907), Dutch painter
Hillary Scholten (born 1982), American politician
J. D. Scholten (born 1980), American baseball player and politician
Jan Hendrik Scholten (1811–1885), Dutch Protestant theologian
Jan Nico Scholten (b. 1932), Dutch politician
Jeff Scholten (born 1977), Canadian short track speed skater
Martha Young-Scholten, American linguist
Marzio Scholten (b. 1982), Dutch jazz guitarist and composer
Matt Scholten (b. 1980s), Australian theatre director
Peter von Scholten (1784–1854), Danish governor-general of the Danish West Indies 1827–48
Reinout Scholten van Aschat (born 1989), Dutch actor
Roland Scholten (b. 1965), Dutch championship darts player
Teddy Scholten (1926–2010), Dutch pop singer
Théo Scholten (born 1963), Luxembourgian footballer
Willem Albert Scholten (1819–1892), founder of Dutch starch manufacturer AVEBE
Willem Scholten (1927–2005), Dutch politician
Ynso Scholten (1918–1984), Dutch politician

See also

Dutch-language surnames